Pygmy refers to a member of any human group whose adult males grow to less than a specific height.

Pygmy may also refer to:

Pygmy (Greek mythology), a tribe of diminutive humans in Greek mythology
Pygmy (novel), 2009 novel by Chuck Palahniuk

See also
 - includes many animals with names of form "Pygmy [noun]"
 - a rarer alternative spelling
 - includes animals with names of form "[Adjective] pygmy [noun]"
Pygmy forest, forest which only contains miniature trees
Forest of the Pygmies, original title El bosque de los pigmeos, 2004 novel by Isabel Allende
King of the Pygmies, 2005 young adult novel by Jonathon Scott Fuqua